Nelson Blanco Flores (born 17 August 1999) is a Salvadoran footballer who plays as an attacking midfielder for North Carolina FC in USL League One and the El Salvador national team.

Career
Blanco played for the academy team at D.C. United for three seasons before signing with North American Soccer League side North Carolina FC on 11 October 2017. He re-signed with North Carolina on 29 January 2018, when the club moved to the United Soccer League. In August 2019, he joined San Diego 1904 FC, an expansion team in the National Independent Soccer Association.

On August 6, 2020, Blanco signed with Oakland Roots SC of the National Independent Soccer Association.

In March 2021, Blanco returned to North Carolina FC of USL League One.

International
Blanco debuted for the El Salvador national team in a 1–0 friendly win over Bolivia on 6 November 2021. Blanco started his first game for the El Salvador national team in a 1–1 tie vs Ecuador on 4 December 2021.He has also recently been called for the World Cup qualifiers.

References

External links
 
 

1999 births
Living people
People from San Miguel, El Salvador
Salvadoran footballers
El Salvador international footballers
Association football midfielders
North Carolina FC players
Oakland Roots SC players
USL Championship players
National Independent Soccer Association players
Salvadoran expatriate footballers
Expatriate soccer players in the United States
Salvadoran expatriate sportspeople in the United States